The {{Nihongo|SS-class landing ship|SS艇 or 機動艇|SS-tei or Kidōtei}} was a class of amphibious assault ships of the Imperial Japanese Army which served during World War II. The SS meaning are Sensha-Small.

Background

October 1938, the IJA employed the Shinshū Maru during their successful amphibious operations at Bias Bay. However, a considerable amount of time was needed to complete the operation owing to the low speed of the landing craft, which resulted in considerable damage to the vessels involved.

The IJA employed the principles of speed and minimum damage to their amphibious warfare operations.

In 1939-1940, the IJA repeated an experiment with Gorō Maru (300 tons gross) and Yorihime Maru (526 tons gross) and after analysing the experiment data placed an order for the prototype Kōryū (later SS No.1).
 The IJN was interested in the second prototype Banryū (later SS No.2). The IJN placed an order for 16 ships. However, thereafter they adopted the No.101-class and the order was cancelled.

Ships in classes

SS No.1

SS No.2

SS No.3 class

 SS No.4, Sunk in action on 12 October 1944
 SS No.5, Sunk in action on 30 November 1944
 SS No.6, Sunk in action on 7 December 1944
 SS No.7
 SS No.8, Sunk in action on 19 November 1944
 SS No.9, Sunk in action on 6 December 1944
 SS No.10, went missing on the night of December 1-2, and lost with all hands after departing Palompon, Leyte.
 SS No.11
 SS No.12, Sunk in action on 21 January 1945
 SS No.13
 SS No.14, Sunk in action on 22 May 1945
 SS No.15
 SS No.16
 SS No.17
 SS No.18
 SS No.19
 SS No.20
 SS No.21
 SS No.22, Sunk in action on 10 August 1945

See also
No.101-class landing ship
Landing craft tank

Footnotes

Bibliography
Monthly Armor Modelling special issue, Navy Yard Vol.9 Tora! Tora! Tora! part-2, Dainippon Kaiga (Japan), November 2008
Rekishi Gunzō, History of Pacific War Vol.37, Support Vessels of the Imperial Japanese Forces, Gakken (Japan), June 2002, 
Ships of the World No.506, (Japan), February 1996
50 year History of Harima Zōsen, Harima Zōsen Corporation, November 1960

Landing craft
Amphibious warfare vessels of Japan
World War II naval ships of Japan
Ships of the Imperial Japanese Army